Punggi-eup (Hangeul: 풍기읍;) is a town in the outer regions of Yeongju City, Gyeongsangbuk-do, South Korea.  It has a population of about 16,000.

A portion of Sobaeksan National Park and the Memorial Park for the Korea Liberation Corps are located in Punggi-eup.

This town is well known throughout Korea for its Ginseng.

It is also the home of Dongyang University.

Administrative subdivisions
Seongnae-ri (성내리/)
Dongbu-ri (동부리/)
Sanbeop-ri (산법리/)
Migok-ri (미곡리/)
Samga-ri (삼가리/)
Ukgeum-ri (욱금리/)
Geumgye-ri (금계리/)
Gyochon-ri (교촌리/)
Seobu-ri (서부리/)
Baek-ri (백리/)
Baeksin-ri (백신리/)
Changrak-ri (창락리/)
Sucheol-ri (수철리/)
Jeongu-ri (전구리/)

See also
 Subdivisions of South Korea
 Geography of South Korea

References 

Towns and townships in North Gyeongsang Province
Yeongju